Louis Rasminsky,  (February 1, 1908 – September 15, 1998) was the third Governor of the Bank of Canada from 1961 to 1973, succeeding James Coyne. He was succeeded by Gerald Bouey.

Born in Montreal, he was raised in Toronto, graduated at Harbord Collegiate Institute, educated at the University of Toronto and the London School of Economics. In 1930, he started at the League of Nations as a specialist in monetary and banking issues. He joined the Bank of Canada in 1940, becoming executive assistant to the Governors of the Bank from 1943 to 1954 and Deputy Governor in 1955.

He served as Canada's executive director at the International Monetary Fund from 1946 until 1962. He was also executive director at the International Bank for Reconstruction and Development from 1950 to 1962.

In 1968, he was made a Companion of the Order of Canada, Canada's highest civilian honour, "for his services to Canada and a life-long career in the fields of international economic affairs and central banking". In 1968, he was awarded the Outstanding Achievement Award, the highest honour in the Public Service of Canada. He was the first Canadian to receive an honorary degree from Yeshiva University. He also received honorary degrees from Carleton University, Trent University, the University of British Columbia and Concordia University (1975).

In the 1960s, the distinguished Rideau Club in Ottawa declined to admit Rasminsky on account of the fact that he was Jewish. It succumbed to pressure from Prime Minister Lester B. Pearson, among others.

Canadian historian Bruce Muirhead received the Joseph and Fay Tanenbaum Award for Canadian Jewish History for his biography of Rasminsky, Against the Odds: The Public Life and Times of Louis Rasminsky (University of Toronto Press, 1999).

His daughter, Lola Rasminsky, is the Founder and Director of the Avenue Road Arts School in Toronto. His son, Dr. Michael Rasminsky, practices neurology at the Montreal General Hospital.

References

External links
 Order of Canada Citation
 Louis Rasminsky at The Canadian Encyclopedia

1908 births
1998 deaths
People from Montreal
Canadian Jews
Alumni of the London School of Economics
Canadian Commanders of the Order of the British Empire
Governors of the Bank of Canada
Companions of the Order of Canada
University of Toronto alumni